White Pond is a lake in Putnam County, in the U.S. state of New York.

White Pond was named after the local White family.

References

Landforms of Putnam County, New York
Ponds of New York (state)